Mario Jorge Baudoin Weeks (September 4, 1942 – May 18, 2019) was a Bolivian biologist and conservationist known for his research in Bolivia and Costa Rica. He received the 2008 Distinguished Services Award from the Society for Conservation Biology. 

Born in Sucre, Baudoin received his education in the United States, earning a B.Sc. at the City University of New York in 1967  followed by a master's (1969) and Ph.D. (1976) from the University of Michigan. He joined the faculty of the Higher University of San Andrés in 1985.  From 1991 to 1995 he was National Director of Biodiversity Conservation, where  he secured several million dollars from the World Bank to support Bolivia's national park system.  From 1998 to 2002 he served as General Director of Biodiversity under the Vice Ministry of Environment, Natural Resources and Forestry Development, serving several times as Acting Deputy Minister. Baudoin died in La Paz on May 18, 2019, at the age of 76. He is commemorated in the scientific name of the bromeliad species Greigia marioi.

References

1942 births
2019 deaths
Bolivian scientists
City University of New York alumni
University of Michigan alumni
20th-century biologists
Conservationists